Sarapion (also spelled Serapion) was an ancient proto-Somali port city in present-day Somalia. It was situated on a site that later became Mogadishu. Sarapion was briefly mentioned in Ptolemy's Geographia as one of the harbours a trader would encounter after sailing southernly on the Indian Ocean, passing along the way by the Market of Spices (Damo) and the emporium of Opone. The town is believed by modern scholars to have been positioned in the vicinity of Mogadishu and Warsheikh in present-day south-central Somalia.

See also
Maritime history of Somalia

References

Ancient Somalia
City-states
African civilizations
Maritime history of Somalia
Ancient Greek geography of East Africa